The Lawn is a mid-twentieth-century low-rise building located on the outskirts of Old Harlow, to the east of the town of Harlow, England.

The building is noted as being the first residential tower block in the UK, as well as being the location of its first pedestrian precinct. The structure was completed in 1951 to coincide with the Festival of Britain.

Construction 

Architect Sir Frederick Gibberd was appointed master planner for Harlow New Town in 1946, tasked with constructing the estate largely using two-storey houses with a private garden. Gibberd however was a keen proponent of mixed development styles, and insisted (to the Company's disapproval) that 20-30% of the site include flats.

The building has an unconventional ‘butterfly’ shape, built so as to preserve a number of old oak trees within its vicinity, as well as to give each flat a south-facing balcony. Nine residential floors each have four flats per floor, with a total of 36 flats in the building.

Upon completion, The Lawn was awarded a Ministry of Health Housing medal.

Response 

The building marked the beginning of a long period of construction of high rise residential buildings, which by 1975 had produced a total of "440,000 high-rise flats for public housing" in the UK. The government at the time offered a subsidy for every storey added to projects.

Harlow was notably one of few towns to see council tower block construction into the late 1980s, despite changing Government policies, concluding with the construction of Netteswell Tower in 1986.

See also 
 Tower blocks in Great Britain

References

External links 

 Historic England profile
 Royal Institute of British Architects

Housing estates in England
Modernist architecture in England
1951 establishments in England
Residential buildings completed in 1951
Buildings and structures in Harlow